Hossein Shahabi (28 November 1967 – 22 January 2023) was an Iranian film director, screenwriter and film producer.

Biography
Shahabi has got Cinema Directing master's degree and Classical Music B.A from Tehran University. After graduation from Tehran University in classical music studies, he spent a few years teaching music. In 1996 he made his first (short) film (Hundred Times Hundred), on the occasion of 100th anniversary of cinema, and received a prize at the (one off) festival, established for the same occasion. Since then he has written, directed and produced 20 shorts, 10 fictional features (for video release in the Iranian market) and 5 features, for the theatrical release, some of them won prizes in the local and international film festivals. The Bright Day (2013) has been his debut, which was well received by the critics and it was nominated in four categories in Fajr International Film Festival, Tehran (February 2013) and won two Honorary Diplomas.
The Bright Day had its international premiere at the competition in Mar del Plata film festival, (2013) and got a special mention of the jury. It was also screened at festivals like, 3rd Persian International Film Festival Sydney, Australia, 28th Boston Film Festival, 21st Houston Film Festival, 18th Washington DC Film Festival, 29th Los Angeles Film Festival, the UCAL and The Rice University, in the States and has won the best direction and best film prize, at 24th Festival of Films from Iran, at Chicago's Gene Siskel Film Center, also winning Silver Pheasant Award and a cash prize for The Best Debut Director of the 19th International Film Festival of Kerala, India. The Sale is second long feature film of Hossein Shahabi.  For the first time in the 21st international festivals Vesoul France is on the screen.

Shahabi died from a lung infection on 22 January 2023, at the age of 55.

Cinematic style
FIPRESCI/Cinema critic Lalit Rao writes about the first film Hossein Shahabi: Iranian director Hossein Shahabi chose to highlight the importance of the criminal justice system in his homeland Iran. His debut feature The Bright Day (Rooz-e Roshan) depicts the relentless efforts of a brave woman to ensure that truth should prevail at all costs. What makes his film remarkable is the incessant travels carried out in the car by its protagonist Roshan who wouldn't stop at anything in order to save her lover from death penalty. She is constantly on the move in her car in order to convince witnesses to speak the truth which would result in a person escaping the death penalty. This film constantly reminds viewers a lot about films made by Abbas Kiarostami especially 'Close-Up' and 'Like Someone in Love' whose leading players were always on the move to achieve their personal goals. Iranian actress Pantea Bahram is quite convincing in her role as the lone crusader of justice. It was for this film that Hossein Shahabi won silver crow pheasant award for best débutant director during 19th International Film Festival of Kerala 2014.

Filmography

Awards and international presence
 Won best film award and Best Editor Award for the film Echoes the Iranian national media festival (1996) 
 Diploma and a cash prize for the winner of Best Screenplay writing Script "havva" first festival Women and war (2000)
 Won Diploma award the best screenplay of the 31st Fajr International Film Festival for the movie "the bright day" (2013)
 Won Diploma award the best Actress of the 31st Fajr International Film Festival for the movie "the bright day" (2013)
 Candidate a Crystal simorgh award at 31st Fajr International Film Festival for best first film for the movie bright day (2013)

 Candidate a Crystal simorgh award for Best Actor at 31st Fajr International Film Festival for the movie "the bright day" (2013)
 Candidate a Crystal simorgh award for Best Sound recorder at 31st Fajr Film Festival for the movie "the bright day" (2013)
 Candidate a Crystal simorgh award for Best Graphic Design at 31st Fajr Film Festival for the movie "the bright day" (2013)
 Won Special Mention of the Jury-at 28th Mar del Plata International Film Festival for the movie the bright day (2014)
 Won Best Film Award at 24th Chicago Iranian Film Festival in America for the movie the bright day (2014) 
 Companies at 28th Film Festival in Boston America for the movie the bright day (2014) 
 Companies at 21 Film Festival in Houston America for the movie the bright day (2014) 
 Companies at 18 Film Festival in Washington DC America for the movie the bright day (2014)   
 Companies at the Iranian films festival in America Rice University for the movie "the bright day" (2014) 
 Companies at the Iranian films festival in America The Los Angeles Museum of Art for the movie "the bright day"(2014)
 Companies at the Iranian films festival in America UCLA University for the movie "the bright day" (2014) 
 Companies at the 3rd Persian International Film Festival Sydney, Australia for the movie "the bright day" (2014) 
 Companies at the 21st international film festival of Asian cinema Vesoul, France, for the movie "the sale" (2015) 
 Won Silver Pheasant Award and a cash prize for The Best Debut Director of the 19th International Film Festival of Kerala, India (2014)
 Companies at the 11th international film festival of Zurich for the movie "the bright day" (2015)
 Companies at the 15th film festival of Stockholm, Sweden for the movie "The Sale" (2015)
 Companies at the Cambridge Film Festival of 2017 for the movie "conditional release" (2017).
 Companies at the 17th International Film Festival of Tiburon for the movie "conditional release" (2018).

Notes

References

External links
Face to Face is Hossein Shahabi's new film 2022

The Most Prominent Face of Iranian Cinema after Kiarotsami imdb
Hossein Shahabi at Iranian New Wave imdb
bani film canditional release
dailyamin dailyamin.20 December 2014. Retrieved 28 January 2015.
MeeraSahib Online meerasahib 2014/12/19 Retrieved 31 January 2015.
Mehrnews mehrnews 2013/7/14 Retrieved 31 January 2015.
jamejamonline jamejamonline 2013/8/11 Retrieved 1 JanuarY 2015.
letterboxed letterboxed Retrieved 2 January 2015.
lisbon film festival.conditional release
 

1967 births
2023 deaths
Iranian film directors
People from Tabriz
Iranian film editors
Iranian film producers
University of Tehran alumni
Iranian photographers
Persian-language film directors
Iranian screenwriters
Iranian film score composers